Chewing Gum is the debut novel of Libyan writer Mansour Bushnaf, first published in Arabic 2008 in Cairo. It was banned by the Gaddafi regime in Libya. It was first published in English in 2014 by DARF Publishers with a translation by Mona Zaki.

Plot summary
The novel centres around Mukhtar, whose father, Omar Efendi, was in the Royal Police Force, and his mother, Rahma, was from a Turco-Libyan family; Mukhtar stands frozen for ten years like a statue in the middle of public park in Libyan capital Tripoli after he was abandoned by his lover, the young and promiscuous Fatma. While the country is gripped with a chewing gum craze, different Libyan professors that just came from their studies abroad try to rediscover the country and suggest different theories to explain a society gripped with chewing gum and consumerism.

Characters
Mukhtar - The Hero
Fatma - The Heroine
Omar Effendi - Mukhtar's Father
Ghouiliya - A Prostitute
Rahma - MuKhtar's Mother
Uthman - Rahma's Friend

Reviews
 Winstonsdad's Review of Mansour Bushanf's Chewing Gum, Winstonsdad's Blog, May 19, 2014
 Bookshy Review of Mansour Bushnaf's Chewing Gum, Bookshy An African Book Lover blog, July 3, 2014
 Nahla Ink Review of Mansour Bushnaf's Chewing Gum, Nahla Ink Blog, July 15, 2014
 Ramblings of an Elfpire Review of Chewing Gum By Mansour Bushnaf, Ramblings of an Elfpire, September 30, 2014
 By the Book Reviews on Chewing Gum by Mansour Bushnaf, By the Book Reviews, November 1, 2014

External links
 Mansour Bushnaf on 'killing books' in Libya (interview), BBC News Africa, April 15, 2014

2014 novels
Libyan novels
Novels set in Libya
2008 novels
2008 debut novels